The 2001 Bankfin Cup was the second tier of the second stage of the 63rd season of the Currie Cup, South Africa's premier domestic rugby union competition, since it started in 1889. The competition was known as the Bankfin Cup for sponsorship reasons and this stage was contested from 19 September to 17 September 2001.

Competition rules and information

There were six participating teams in the 2001 Bankfin Cup. These teams qualified from a qualification series by finishing in the bottom three teams in one of two sections. The points accumulated against the two other teams that qualified were carried forward to the Bankfin Cup stage. In this stage, teams played the three teams from the opposite qualification section once, either at home or away.

Teams received four points for a win and two points for a draw. Bonus points were awarded to teams that scored four or more tries in a game, as well as to teams that lost a match by seven points or less. Teams were ranked by log points, then points difference (points scored less points conceded). The top four teams qualified for the semi-finals.

Teams

Team Listing

Log

Matches

The following matches were played in the 2001 Bankfin Cup:

Round One

Round Two

Round Three

Semi-finals

Final

References

2001 Currie Cup
2001